Human Rights in China is a New York-based international, Chinese, non-governmental organization with intentions to promote international human rights and facilitate the institutional protection of these rights in the People's Republic of China. HRIC is a member organization of the International Federation for Human Rights. According to Fang Lizhi, HRIC is committed to an independent, non-political, and intelligent approach

Founded by Chinese students and scholars in March 1989, HRIC [Human Rights In China] implements programs to generate infrastructural change in China while also engaging in advocacy strategies on behalf of individuals living in China.

With offices in Hong Kong and New York City, HRIC serves as a source of analysis and information on the human rights situation in China, as well as an active NGO advocate in the international arena. In 2005, HRIC was also recognized for its creative and effective use of technology by The Tech Museum of Innovation as one of twenty-five Tech Award Laureates of the year.

Its former Executive Director is Xiao Qiang.

Program
HRIC links individual advocacy with systemic and policy interventions addressing human rights, technology, legal and administrative reform issues. HRIC's core programs and reports address human rights violations affecting China's rural population, migrant workers, ethnic minorities, women, and children.

Domestic advocacy
HRIC's domestic work with political prisoners provides support for legal representation and assistance to activists in China. HRIC works with domestic Chinese groups internationally and domestically in calling upon the Chinese government to engage in a constructive reassessment of the 1989 Tiananmen Square protests and massacre and to move toward greater reforms and social stability.

By supporting domestic groups such as the Tiananmen Mothers, HRIC links Chinese calls for redress to current international debates such as lifting the European Union arms embargo on China. HRIC's online June 4 Archive, is a Chinese-language archive documenting the history of the 1989 Tiananmen democracy movement. HRIC also maintains Fill the Square, an online petition mobilizing individuals and organizations worldwide to support the Tiananmen Mothers' demands for accountability for the June Fourth crackdown.

International advocacy
HRIC's advocacy initiatives contribute to multilateral and bilateral human rights policy discussions, analyses, and recommendations. HRIC provides briefings and reports to United Nations bodies, international conferences, WTO processes, and the EU-China Dialogue. As of 2006, HRIC has submitted over 40 individual cases of the victims of human rights abuses to the UN Working Group on Arbitrary Detention; 13 of the cases have had decisions made on them, and all of the 13 have been deemed arbitrary.

HRIC regularly addresses the relationship between corporate social responsibility, trade, and human rights through reports, briefings, and presentations, thus contributing to a global framework that respects and promotes human rights. HRIC has outlined a best practices matrix for IT companies doing business in China involving information communication technology (ICT), surveillance and security, multilaterals, the media, governments, and NGOs.

Online advocacy
HRIC's online advocacy project supports Chinese citizens' increasing activism and promotes the free flow of information in China by building a technology platform that uses proxy server technology and a biweekly e-newsletter sent to hundreds of thousands of subscribers in China. The project includes the development of six interrelated Web sites with online Chinese publications, tools for accountability, and advocacy resources.

Ongoing publications
China Rights Forum is HRIC's bilingual semiannual journal. Since its founding in 1990, it has covered a range of issues regarding China's human rights developments. It includes articles from Chinese scholars, artists, writers and activists promoting democratic reform, labor rights, freedom of expression, and the rights of religious and ethnic minorities and disadvantaged groups. Archives of the articles are available online.

China Human Rights Biweekly is a Chinese-language biweekly journal publishing in-depth analyses, current events commentaries, theoretical discussions, and law reviews, in addition to news from China that has been banned and censored in the mainland. Issues covered have included torture and corruption in China, Internet censorship, and China's legal system. The majority of the contributors and readers are mainland Chinese Internet users.

Daily News Brief is HRIC's daily news roundup.

Reports
HRIC has published thematic reports and briefings, issues backgrounders, and short reports on topics involving ethnic minorities, women and children, control of the media, labor rights and state secrets, legal reform, and social unrest. HRIC also issues long reports on human rights issues and circulates them to multilateral bodies, media, policy makers, governments, and NGOs.

Funding
HRIC is funded by private foundations and individuals from Europe, Asia, and North America. Since it was founded, HRIC has obtained support from groups including the National Endowment for Democracy, Open Society Institute, the International Centre for Human Rights and Democratic Development, the European Human Rights Foundation, Human Rights Watch, and Asia Watch. In 2006, the New York University School of Law honored Robert L. Bernstein by establishing the Robert L. Bernstein Fellowship in International Human Rights which supports an annual, one-year fellowship for recent graduates to work with the NGO.

See also
 Human rights in the People's Republic of China
 Gao Wenqian

References

External links
 Human Rights in China 
 中国人权 
 中國人權 
 HRIC Biweekly（中国人权双周刊） - HRIC's biweekly Chinese journal.
 China Rights Forum - HRIC's semiannual bilingual journal.
 

Human rights in China
Human rights organizations based in the United States
International Federation for Human Rights member organizations
1989 Tiananmen Square protests and massacre
Non-profit organizations based in New York City
Organizations established in 1989
Organizations of the Revolutions of 1989
1989 establishments in New York (state)